One ship of the United States Navy has been named Poseidon for the Greek god of the sea.

Fictitious ship
 A fictitious USS Poseidon (SSN-729) is the title "character" in the 2005 film USS Poseidon: Phantom Below.

See also
 

United States Navy ship names